The Nottingham Built-up Area (BUA), Nottingham Urban Area, or Greater Nottingham is an area of land defined by the Office for National Statistics as which is built upon, with nearby areas linked if within 200 metres - see the List of urban areas in the United Kingdom article for a broader definition. It consists of the city of Nottingham and the adjoining urban areas of Nottinghamshire and Derbyshire, in the East Midlands of England. It had a total population of 729,977 at the time of the 2011 census. This was an increase of almost 10% since the 2001 census recorded population of 666,358, due to population increases, reductions and several new sub-divisions.

Geography 

Greater Nottingham is largely within the three districts of Rushcliffe, Broxtowe and Gedling surrounding the city, though the area spills into the Nottinghamshire district of Ashfield, and also to the Amber Valley and Erewash districts of Derbyshire.

The Nottingham Urban Area is bounded to the west by a narrow gap between Draycott (to the west of the Breaston urban area sub-division) and Borrowash (to the east of the Derby Urban Area). The Heanor/Ripley and West Hallam north-western extensions have a somewhat tenuous linkage through to the core of Nottingham City largely due to ribbon development, and are in close proximity to other nearby urban areas which together, almost link to Derby from the north.

Sub-divisions do not always match administrative geographic boundaries; the subdivision of Clifton for example is within the Nottingham Unitary Authority city area but is subdivided by the River Trent. The Nottingham subdivision oversteps the city's borders at several locations. Together, these two subdivisions exceed the official city population (305,680 in 2011) as a result, even though West Bridgford includes the counts of city suburbs Silverdale and Wilford.

In the 1991 census, Ilkeston was considered outside of the Nottingham Urban Area, and its addition gave the BUA an 8% increase in 2001. This was due to improvements in mapping methodology by the ONS, and is chiefly responsible for the increase in sub-divisions over censuses rather than any large scale 'bricks and mortar' building, as much of the area between the cities is protected green belt and wedges, restricting actual development.

Greater Nottingham Partnership/D2N2
The local authorities collaborate in some ways. The Greater Nottingham Partnership considered Greater Nottingham to consist of the City of Nottingham plus the entirety of the Rushcliffe, Broxtowe and Gedling boroughs, along with Hucknall from Ashfield, but no part of Derbyshire, as no Derbyshire council was a member of the Partnership. They together worked as an advisory and lobbying body for projects and decisions involving the region. However it was axed due to funding in 2011 and the D2N2 Local Enterprise Partnership is instead assuming those functions with cross-county political and local business support.

Nottingham-Derby metropolitan area
The conurbation forms a large part of the Nottingham-Derby metropolitan area, which has an estimated population of 1.5 million.
The urban areas of both Derby and Nottingham are almost continuous with Draycott (part of the Breaston Urban sub-division) being almost continuous with the Borrowash part of the Derby Urban Area.
The Mansfield Urban Area also forms part of this metropolitan area, although it is not continuous with the Nottingham Urban Area. However, it is almost continuous with the Alfreton/South Normanton Built-up area, which had a population of 41,289 according to the last census, with the South Normanton/Pinxton Urban sub-division of the Alfreton Urban Area being almost continuous with the Sutton-in-Ashfield Urban sub-division of the Mansfield Urban Area. The Alfreton Urban Area is also nearly continuous with Ripley part of the Nottingham Urban Area. Other minor urban areas to the west of the Ripley, Heanor and West Hallam sub divisions daisy-chain towards Derby from the north, notably Belper, Kilburn and Crich/Heage. See the maps above for a demonstration of these BUAs in close proximity.

See also
Derby Built-up area
Nottingham and Derby Green Belt
List of conurbations in the United Kingdom
List of metropolitan areas in the United Kingdom

References

External links 
Scalable map highlighting the 2011 Nottingham BUA and subdivisions
Office for National Statistics: Census 2001, Key Statistics for urban areas
Top 50 Urban Areas - 1991 Census
Map depicting ONS definition
Nottingham Insight - Key datasets

Nottingham
Geography of Nottinghamshire
Urban areas of England
Geography of Derbyshire